The Ixelles Ponds or Elsene Ponds are two freshwater ponds in the Brussels municipality of Ixelles, Belgium. The ponds we can see today are those spared by a 19th-century campaign of drying the wetlands of the Maalbeek valley between La Cambre Abbey and the Place Eugène Flagey.

With the surrounding park, the Ixelles Ponds are the tip of a long strip of almost uninterrupted greenery reaching all the way from the Sonian Forest deep into Brussels' urban tissue.

The ponds are an extremely popular recreation area for local residents pertaining to the Belgian upper-crust. However, in the late 1990s, the water was polluted with cyanobacteria. This is still the case with the boating lake in the nearby Bois de la Cambre/Ter Kamerenbos where signs are posted at regular intervals, warning of a risk of botulism. Fishing is allowed in the ponds on Wednesdays, Sundays and public holidays.

See also
 List of parks and gardens in Brussels
 Résidence de la Cambre

External links

 Description of the ponds on the Belgian Tourism Board website
 Article in Le Soir newspaper about the cyanobacteria infestation in 1998
 Fishing rules on the Commune of Ixelles website

Lakes of Brussels
Parks in Brussels
Urban public parks
Ixelles